David Kriesel may refer to:
 Greg K.
 German computer scientist (de) who revealed the Xerox character substitution bug